Lu Zhiqiang (born 1952) is a Chinese businessman. He was the chairman of Oceanwide Holdings, a Chinese property company, until May 2020.

At a 21 May 2020 Oceanwide Holdings board meeting, Lu stood down as chairman, and his position was assumed by Song Hongmo. On 29 May 2020, Lu stood down as CEO, and that position was also assumed by Song Hongmo.

Lu is a member of the Chinese Communist Party, but does not hold any official government positions.  He is a member of the standing committee of the Chinese People's Political Consulative Conference (CPPCC).

Early life 
Lu Zhiqiang was born in 1952. He has an MA degree from Fudan University.

Career 
According to Forbes, Lu Zhiqiang has a net worth of $5.2 billion, as of August 2015.

Personal life 
He is married, and lives in Beijing.

References 

1952 births
Living people
Chinese company founders
Chinese billionaires
Fudan University alumni
Chinese real estate businesspeople
China Oceanwide Holdings Group